Skriðuklaustur is an old farmstead and a historic site in the valley of Fljótsdalur in Iceland with the ruins of a 16th-century monastery which were revealed by an archaeological excavation between 2002 and 2012.

On site is the mansion of the famous Icelandic writer Gunnar Gunnarsson (1889–1975), built in 1939 when he returned home after living in Denmark for more than 30 years. The mansion was designed by German architect Fritz Höger is now a centre of culture & history with exhibitions, personal guided tours and the renowned restaurant Klausturkaffi. Snæfellsstofa, one of the visiting centers for the Vatnajökull National Park is also at Skriðuklaustur.

Nearby is the end of the tunnel that is leading water from Kárahnjúkastífla Dam, approx 50 km away, to the power plant in Fljótsdalur near Skriðuklaustur.

External links
Skriðuklaustur official website
Vatnajökull National Park official website

Houses in Iceland
Biographical museums in Iceland